Alberto Marchán (born 29 April 1947) is a Venezuelan sprinter. He competed in the men's 4 × 100 metres relay at the 1972 Summer Olympics.

References

External links
 

1947 births
Living people
Athletes (track and field) at the 1971 Pan American Games
Athletes (track and field) at the 1972 Summer Olympics
Venezuelan male sprinters
Olympic athletes of Venezuela
Place of birth missing (living people)
Pan American Games competitors for Venezuela
20th-century Venezuelan people
21st-century Venezuelan people